Max Rheinstein (July 5, 1899 − July 9, 1977) was a German-born American jurist and political scientist. He was for many years a professor at the University of Chicago Law School.

Biography
Max Rheinstein was born on July 5, 1899, in Bad Kreuznach, the only son of wine merchant Ferdinand Rheinstein (1842-1904) and Rosalie Bernheim (1858-1928). He fought in the German Army in World War I, and subsequently studied law at the University of Munich. In the spring of 1919 Rheinstein participated in the overthrow of the Bavarian Soviet Republic. Becoming an assistant of Ernst Rabel, Rheinstein received his doctorate in law in 1924. He subsequently followed Rabel to Berlin as a research lecturer at the Kaiser Wilhelm Institute for Foreign and International Private Law, where he supervised the institute library. He joined the Social Democratic Party of Germany (SPD) in 1928.

Unlike other SPD-members and Jews, Rheinstein was not dismissed from his position after the Nazi seizure of power, due to the fact that he had fought the Bavarian Soviet Republic in 1919. In February 1933, he received a scholarship from the Rockefeller Foundation, and emigrated to the United States, where he began working at Columbia Law School. In 1936 he was appointed Max Pam Professor of American and Foreign Law and Professor of Political Science at the University of Chicago Law School, a position he held until his retirement in 1968. Rheinstein became an American citizen in 1940. After World War II, Rheinstein returned to Germany, where he was a member of the Legal Division of the Office of Military Government and served in a division of the Allied Control Council in Berlin. 

In 1953, Rheinstein was awarded the Ordre des Palmes académiques and the Great Cross of Merit of the Federal Republic of Germany. He was awarded a Guggenheim Fellowship in 1954. Until 1968 he was a member of the American Academy of Arts and Sciences.

Rheinstein moved to Palo Alto, California in 1976 for health reasons. He died in Bad Gastein, Austria on July 9, 1977.

References

 Oliver Lepsius: Rheinstein, Max. In: Neue Deutsche Biographie (NDB). Band 21, Duncker & Humblot, Berlin 2003, S. 493 f.

External links
Guide to the Max Rheinstein Papers 1869-1977 at the University of Chicago Special Collections Research Center
 

1899 births
1977 deaths
20th-century American lawyers
20th-century Freikorps personnel
Aix-Marseille University alumni
American jurists
Academic staff of the Catholic University of Leuven (1834–1968)
Columbia Law School faculty
Commanders Crosses of the Order of Merit of the Federal Republic of Germany
Fellows of the American Academy of Arts and Sciences
Free University of Brussels (1834–1969) alumni
Academic staff of the Free University of Brussels (1834–1969)
Jewish emigrants from Nazi Germany to the United States
German Jewish military personnel of World War I
Jurists from Rhineland-Palatinate
Academic staff of Goethe University Frankfurt
Humboldt University of Berlin alumni
Legal scholars of the University of Cambridge
Louisiana State University faculty
Ludwig Maximilian University of Munich alumni
People from Bad Kreuznach
Stockholm University alumni
University of Basel alumni
University of Chicago Law School faculty
Academic staff of the University of Freiburg
University of Michigan faculty
Academic staff of the University of Strasbourg
Academic staff of the University of Tokyo